Ruben Cornelis Lucas Moolhuizen (born June 13, 1998), known by his stage name as Ruben Annink (born in Amsterdam on June 13, 1998), is a Dutch singer-songwriter.

Career 
In 2012, he participated in the second season of The Voice Kids., but didn't get past the "Battle-round". In 2015, he was a candidate in the fourth season of De beste singer-songwriter in which he became the runner up in the finals against Anna Rune.

On May 22, 2015, Ruben Annink appeared as a guest, with Ali B, in the Dutch TV program De Wereld Draait Door. Here he and Ali performed the song 'Terwijl jullie nog bij me zijn', as an hommage to Ali B his kids. In 2018, Ruben Annink left his record label Trifecta and joined Warner Music Benelux.

On January 25, 2016, he wrote a song about writer Pia de Jong in honor of her book called Charlotte which she presented in De Wereld Draait Door. The day after he performed the song in the same program. Also in 2016 he brought out the single 'Nu of Nooit', together with rapper Johnna Fraser and DJ and vlogger Monica Geuze and wrote the Dutch themesong for Angry Birds: The Movie.

In February 2017, he released the song 'Twee Shots' with rapper Keizer, a month later the single 'Rokjesdag' followed. Later that year he released the song 'Tijdmachine' with Teske De Schepper. 

In the end of August 2019, Ruben appeared in the Dutch TV program Beste Zangersand in early 2020 he played at Eurosonic Noorderslag. This performance was the startingpoint of a clubtour crossing through the Netherlands. Unfortunately this tour was postponed because of the COVID-19 pandemic. From that point on Ruben focused on creating new songs, of which he released 'Papa' and 'Dat Het Morgen Lukt' for the multiple champion paralympic snowboarder Bibian Mentel who was fighting cancer. His clubtour recommenced in October 2021.

Discography 
Singles

References 

Living people
1998 births
Musicians from Amsterdam
Dutch male singer-songwriters
The Voice (franchise) contestants
De beste singer-songwriter
Warner Music Group artists